Ludwig Barth zu Barthenau (17 January 1839 – 3 August 1890) was an Austrian chemist born in Rovereto.

He studied under Justus von Liebig (1803-1873) in Munich, and in 1867 was appointed professor of chemistry at the University of Innsbruck. In 1876 he succeeded Heinrich Hlasiwetz (1825-1875) as professor of chemistry at the University of Vienna.

He is remembered for his studies of benzol derivatives, and is credited with the discovery of resorcinol. With Adolf Lieben (1836-1914) he founded the journal Monatshefte für Chemie.

Published works 
 Über die Einwirkung des Chlors auf den Amylalkohol, 1861 – The action of chlorine on amyl alcohol.
 Über die Einwirkung des Broms auf Glycerin, 1862 – The action of bromine on glycerol.

References 
 Scholars in stone and bronze: (biography)

Academic staff of the University of Innsbruck
Academic staff of the University of Vienna
Austrian chemists
1839 births
1890 deaths
People from Rovereto
Members of the Austrian Academy of Sciences